Elaeagnus conferta is a species of Eleagnus found in Southeast Asia

Gallery

References

External links
 
 

conferta